Lowe Bluff is a high, ice-covered bluff between the head of Kansas Glacier and Alaska Canyon, along the Watson Escarpment, Antarctica. It was mapped by the United States Geological Survey from ground surveys and U.S. Navy air photos, 1960–63, and was named by the Advisory Committee on Antarctic Names for William G. Lowe, a radioman with the Byrd Station winter party, 1957.

References

External links

Cliffs of Antarctica
Marie Byrd Land